Kengal Hanumanthaiah Ministry was the Council of Ministers in Mysore, a state in South India headed by Kengal Hanumanthaiah of the Indian National Congress.

The ministry had multiple  ministers including the Chief Minister of Mysore. All ministers belonged to the Indian National Congress.

Kengal Hanumanthaiah became Chief Minister of Mysore after Indian National Congress emerged victorious 1952 Mysore elections.

Chief Minister & Cabinet Ministers

Minister of State

See also 
 Mysore Legislative Assembly
 Mysore Legislative Council
 Politics of Mysore

References 

Cabinets established in 1952
1952 establishments in Mysore State
1952 in Indian politics
1956 disestablishments in India
Hanumanthaiah
Indian National Congress state ministries
Cabinets disestablished in 1956